The Whitgift Foundation is a charity based in Croydon, South London, England. The purpose of the charity is to provide education for the young and care for the elderly.

The main activities of the charity are the operation of three independent schools, providing sheltered accommodation and nursing care through three care homes and running the Carer's Information Service. In addition, the charity provides bursaries and scholarships in excess of £5million a year.

The foundation is governed by a Court of Governors, including the Bishop of Croydon; the Vicar of Croydon; and nominees of the Archbishop of Canterbury and Croydon Council.

History

The Whitgift Foundation was founded in 1596 by the Archbishop of Canterbury, John Whitgift. His aims were to provide care for the elderly and education for the young.

Originally three separate buildings were built, The Hospital of Holy Trinity (now known as The Almshouses), The School House and Schoolmaster’s House. The latter two were demolished in 1897, leaving the Almshouses as the only remaining original building. The Whitgift Centre, a large shopping mall, now stands where the later Victorian school and surrounding buildings and sports fields were. These buildings were occupied in turn by Whitgift School, prior to its move to south Croydon in 1931, and then by Trinity School, prior to its move to Shirley Park.

Schools
The Whitgift Foundation runs three independent day schools in Croydon:

 Whitgift School, for boys aged 10–19 years
 Trinity School of John Whitgift, for boys aged 10–19 years, with a co-educational sixth form
 Old Palace of John Whitgift School incorporating Old Palace Nursery, a Day Nursery for girls up to 4 years, and Old Palace of John Whitgift School for girls aged 4 to 19 years.

John Whitgift Academy in Grimsby in Lincolnshire is named after John Whitgift, who was born in the town, but is not part of the Whitgift Foundation.

References

External links 
Official site
Timeline of the Whitgift Foundation

Whitgift Facebook Page
Whitgift Twitter Page

1596 establishments in England
Foundations based in England
Buildings and structures in the London Borough of Croydon
Charities based in London